Profundiconus puillandrei is a species of sea snail, a marine gastropod mollusk in the family Conidae, the cone snails and their allies.

Like all species within the genus Profundiconus, these cone snails are predatory and venomous. They are capable of "stinging" humans, therefore live ones should be handled carefully or not at all.

Description
The length of the shell attains 43.2 mm.

Distribution
This marine species occurs in the Pacific Ocean off the Norfolk Ridge (off New Caledonia)

References

External links
 Tenorio M.J. & Castelin M. (2016). Genus Profundiconus Kuroda, 1956 (Gastropoda, Conoidea): Morphological and molecular studies, with the description of five new species from the Solomon Islands and New Caledonia. European Journal of Taxonomy. 173: 1–45
 

puillandrei
Gastropods described in 2016